Dudley Henry John Kernick (24 August 1921 – 15 December 2019) was an English professional footballer who played as a forward. He played in the English football league for Torquay United, Northampton Town and Birmingham City.

Kernick later retired to Florida, but moved back to Nuneaton in his final years. He died on 15 December 2019, at the age of 98.

References

1921 births
2019 deaths
Association football forwards
Birmingham City F.C. players
English Football League players
English footballers
Northampton Town F.C. players
Torquay United F.C. players
People from Camelford